The batting championship is awarded to the Chinese Professional Baseball League player who has the highest batting average in a particular season.

Currently, a player needs to accrue an average of at least 3.1 plate appearances for each game his team plays in order to qualify for the batting title.

Champions

External links

Chinese Professional Baseball League lists
Chinese Professional Baseball League awards